Alaybeyi can refer to:

 Alaybeyi, Aziziye
 Alaybeyi, İmamoğlu